This is a list of schools in the Northern Territory of Australia. The Northern Territory education system traditionally consists of primary schools, which accommodate students from transition to Year 6, and high schools, which accommodate students from Years 7 to 12.

State schools

State primary schools

State high schools

Remote schools 

A significant percentage of the Territory's population are Aboriginal people living in remote areas. Most of these are based in communities, which are like towns but differ in that they are owned and run by the local population. Some communities viewed as sustainable in the long-term have been labelled "Territory Growth Towns" by the Territory Government and will attract increased investment to improve services.

Other state schools 

This includes special schools (schools for disabled children) and schools for specific purposes.

Defunct state schools

Private schools

Catholic schools
In the Northern Territory, Catholic schools are usually (but not always) linked to a parish. Prior to the 1980s, most schools were founded by religious institutes, but with the decrease in membership of these institutes, together with major reforms inside the church, lay teachers and administrators began to take over the schools, a process which completed by approximately 1990.

Schools are administered by Catholic Education Office, Northern Territory, which is administered by the Diocese of Darwin. Preference for enrolment is given to Catholic students from the parish or local area, although non-Catholic students are admitted if room is available.

Independent schools

Defunct private schools

See also
List of schools in Australia
School of the Air

References

External links

List of urban and remote schools operated by the Northern Territory Government
CEO Northern Territory
Our Schools at Association of Independent Schools NT

Northern Territory
 
Schools
Schools